Harold Hartley may refer to:

 Harold Hartley (chemist) (1878–1972), British physical chemist
 Harold Hartley (businessman) (1851–1943), British journalist, publisher and mineral water manufacturer
 Harold Hartley (politician) (1875–1958), Australian politician, member of the Queensland Legislative Assembly